Sharad Gogate, born Sharadchandra Prabhakar Gogate on 27 June 1936, is a Marathi publisher and writer from Maharashtra, India.

Biography
Sharad Gogate is the son of Prabhakar Gopal Gogate and Sumati Prabhakar Gogate of Bhusawal. His father and both his grandfathers were practicing lawyers, and his initial goal was to follow them into a law career. He went to Pune for his education in 1953, attending Fergusson College and ILS Law College. After he earned his L.L.B., he considered practicing in the Mumbai High Court but after working at a large book shop called Deccan Book Stall in Deccan Gymkhana, Pune, his love of books led him to become a bookseller instead. In 1968 Gogate opened his own book shop called Saraswat. He started a publishing company in 1975 called Shubhada Saraswat.

In 1966, Gogate married Pushpa Ranade (Shubhada Gogate) of Nasik, who later became a well-known Marathi author.

Notable works published by Shubhada Saraswat

Important reference works

 Marathi–English Dictionary by Moleswarth
 English-Marathi Dictionary by N. B. Ranade
 Vyutpatti Kosh (व्युत्पत्तिकोश) by K.P. Kulkarni
 Gomantak: Prakruti Ani Sanskruti (3 Volumes) by B. D. Satoskar
 Bharatiya Tatwadnyanacha Bruhad Itihaas (12 Volumes) by G. N. Joshi

Other award-winning publications

 Khandalyachya Ghatasaathi by Shubhada Gogate
 Aaranyak by Milind Vatwe
 Sanskrit Va Prakrit Bhasha by Madhav Deshpande

Other notable publications
Yes, I am Guilty! (1983) by Munawwar Shah

Beyond publishing
In 2001, Sharad Gogate retired from active book publishing and turned to writing about the profession. His most notable writing is Marathi GranthPrakashanachi 200 Varshe, a comprehensive study of the first 200 years of Marathi publishing from 1805 to 2005. This seminal work consolidates a great deal of detailed information that was obtained only through extensive research through vast volumes of material.

Gogate has been a guest lecturer at various courses and workshops on publishing conducted by the University of Pune as well as other well-known educational institutes.

References 

 Delhi Public Library
 University of Heidelberg - South Asia Institute : South Asia: art, theater, film and architecture

1936 births
Living people
Marathi-language writers
People from Bhusawal